Anopinella ophiodes is a species of moth of the family Tortricidae. It is found in Guatemala.

The length of the forewings is about 6.1 mm. The forewings are brownish, crossed by a rosy vinous line. The hindwings are rosy grey.

References

External links
Systematic revision of Anopinella Powell (Lepidoptera: Tortricidae: Euliini) and phylogenetic analysis of the Apolychrosis group of genera

Anopinella
Moths of Central America
Moths described in 1914